Love in the Fascist Brothel is the second and final studio album by San Diego post-hardcore band The Plot to Blow Up the Eiffel Tower, released on Revelation Records and Three One G on February 15, 2005, on compact disc and vinyl formats respectively. The album showed a significant change in sound from the band's previous full-length, focusing much more on the styles of noise rock rather than just jazz punk. The album's title, artwork, and lyrical themes act as political and social commentary on both the presidency of George W. Bush and punk subculture, which the band felt was "dead" by the time they recorded the album.

Packaging and Lyrical Themes
The album has a heavy theme of nazism and fascism throughout the lyrics and artwork. According to the band, this was done to not only mock neo-nazi subculture, but it also acted as political and social commentary on George W. Bush and punk subculture as well.

Track listing
"Reichstag Rock" – 1:45
"Exile on Vain Street" – 2:24
"Love in the Sex Prison" – 2:05
"Vulture Kontrol" – 2:26
"Rattus Über Alles" – 1:21
"Drake the Fake" – 3:05
"Angry, Young and Rich" – 3:12
"Lipstick SS" – 2:38
"Lawnmower Love" – 2:08
"SLC Hunks" – 2:55

Personnel

The Plot To Blow Up The Eiffel Tower
Brandon Welchez - Vocals, saxophone
B.H. Peligro - Drums
Charles Rowell - Guitar
Willy Graves - Bass

Additional Musicians
Brett Bohart
Gabriel Sundy
Gena Abbo
Kelly Kotner
Robert Ackly

Artwork
David McHenry - Photography
xTonyx - Photography
The Plot To Blow Up The Eiffel Tower - Layout

Production
Rafter Roberts - Engineering, production
The Plot To Blow Up The Eiffel Tower - Production
John Golden - Mastering

References

External links
 

2005 albums